Events from the year 1669 in Denmark.

Incumbents 

 Monarch - Frederick III

Events

Undated

Births 
 17 April – Jacob B. Winslow, anatomist (died 1760)

Full date unknown

Deaths

Full date unknown

References 

 
Denmark
Years of the 17th century in Denmark